Shaw Gulch is a valley in San Mateo County, California.

Notes

Valleys of San Mateo County, California
Landforms of the San Francisco Bay Area
Valleys of California